Charles George Beauclerk (20 January 1774 – 25 December 1845) was an English politician who served as Member of Parliament (MP) for the borough of Richmond from 1796 to 1798.

Background and education
He was the only son of Topham Beauclerk and Lady Diana Spencer, Lady of the Bedchamber to Queen Charlotte. He had two half-brothers by his mother's first marriage to Frederick St John, 2nd Viscount Bolingbroke, namely George St John, 3rd Viscount Bolingbroke and Frederick St John (British Army officer). He had twin elder sisters: Elisabeth Beauclerk, who married their cousin George Herbert, 11th Earl of Pembroke, and (Anne) Mary Day Beauclerk, who famously had a long-term relationship with their half-brother Bolingbroke, resulting in several children.

After an education at Eton (1782) and Christ Church, Oxford (1790), George Beauclerk went on a Grand Tour in 1794.  He was a member of Brooks's and the Whig Club.

Career
On his return from the Continent, he paid £5000 for the constituency of Richmond in 1796, but his shyness held him back, and he is not known to have spoken in Parliament.

Beauclerk "took the Chiltern Hundreds" (i.e. resigned as an MP) in 1798, having sat as an opposition MP for just two years.

Marriage and family
At Holland House the political hostess and saloniere Elizabeth Fox, Baroness Holland introduced him to Emily Charlotte "Mimie" Ogilvie (May 1778–22 January 1832), daughter of William Ogilvie and Emily FitzGerald, Duchess of Leinster. Much to the delight of Lady Holland and Beauclerk's friend Lord Holland, the couple married a month later. Emily W. Sunstein, an American biographer of Mary Shelley, describes Charles Beauclerk as a "shy intellectual" and the marriage as "incompatible"

In 1803 he built his family seat, St Leonard's Lodge, in West Sussex. Neighbours included Timothy Shelley at Field Place and Thomas Medwin in Horsham. The Beauclerks circa 1820 travelled en famille to the Continent. Charles took the boys to Geneva, while Emily supervised the girls in Pisa. Percy Bysshe Shelley and Mary Shelley had made their home in the Italian city, and Emily tried to persuade Percy to come to her soirees, an experience which he did not want to repeat until she called on Mary. Medwin, on the other hand, who was seeking a wealthy wife, was happy to attend her sociable evenings. He introduced her to Lord Byron (at both their requests). Claire Clairmont said Medwin and Emily Beauclerk were the two biggest gossips in Pisa - on which anecdotes Medwin based his Conversations with Byron (1824). Edward Ellerker Williams wrote to Edward John Trelawny, attempting to draw him to Pisa:

The couple are variously recorded as having three sons and six daughters or seven daughters and six sons. Their eldest son was Aubrey Beauclerk, an MP, with whom the widowed Mary Shelley was said to be romantically involved. Another son, George Robert Beauclerk, was also an MP. Their daughter Diana Olivia married Sir Francis Fletcher-Vane, 3rd Baronet of Hutton. Their daughter Georgiana "Gee" Paul was one of Mary Shelley's closest friends.

References

Charles George
Members of the Parliament of Great Britain for English constituencies
People educated at Eton College
Whig (British political party) MPs for English constituencies
1774 births
1845 deaths
Charles George